Walton-Verona Independent Schools is a public school district in Boone County in the U.S. state of Kentucky, based in Walton.

Schools
The Walton-Verona Independent Schools School District has one elementary school, one middle school, and one high school.

Elementary school
Walton-Verona Elementary School is located in Verona.

Middle school
Walton-Verona Middle School is located in Walton.

High school
Walton-Verona High School is located in Walton.

References

School districts in Kentucky
Education in Boone County, Kentucky